United States Naval Communications Station Sidi Yahya El Gharb was a U.S. Naval communications station consisting of work facilities, supply, living facilities, and rest and recreation of the United States Navy located just outside of Sidi Yahya El Gharb, Morocco. It was a U.S. Navy installation connected to the Naval Air Station Port Lyautey in Kenitra, Morocco. The base was closed in 1976.

Following its closure in the mid-1970's, the base was returned to the government of the Kingdom of Morocco and was transformed into a military barracks serving Sidi Slimane Air Base by the Royal Moroccan Air Force. As of 2021, it continues to serve in that capacity.

See also 
 Sidi Slimane Air Base

References

External links
 Navcomsta Morocco, Sidi Yahia on Angelfire.com
 Navcomsta Morocco, Sidi Yahia navycthistory.com

Communications and electronic installations of the United States Navy
Military installations closed in 1977

Closed installations of the United States Navy
Air force installations of Morocco